Vidigal is a neighborhood and a favela in Rio de Janeiro, Brazil.

Geography
Vidigal overlooks Ipanema Beach and Ilhas Cagarras. It is located in the South Zone of Rio, between Leblon and São Conrado neighborhoods.

Morro Dois Irmãos

 is also the location of a very frequented and sought-after Two Brothers trail. To complete this hike, one would travel to Vidigal. At the base, near Praça do Vidigal, visitors may choose to ride to the Vila Olímpica soccer field (the entrance for the hike) by Kombi van or on the moto-taxis. There are two viewpoints in this hike before reaching the final destination of the peak. From the first, you will be able to see Rocinha, which is the largest favela in Latin America, and a clear view of Pedra da Gávea. From the second, you are able to see Serra da Carioca, Gávea, Corcovado (where Christ the Redeemer stands tall), and Pedra Bonita. Upon reaching the highest peak of the Morro Dois Irmãos you are able to see all of South Zone (Zona Sul) ranging from Botafogo to Leblon, including a beautiful view of Rodrigo de Freitas Lagoon (Lagoa Rodrigo de Freitas).

Crime 
In November 2011, Vidigal and its neighboring community, Rocinha, were pacified by the Pacifying Police Unit. 

In September 2017, a so-called coup d'état took place in Rocinha  which saw its criminal control shift from ADA to CV ( or Red Command). 

As of December 2017, and through December 2020, Vidigal is a completely transformed favela, for the worse, where it is not uncommon to hear daily heavy arms fire and even see criminals carrying machine-guns on the main street, Av. Presidente João Goulart at all times of day. In 2020, at times there were gun battles between the military police and drug traffickers.

Gallery

References

Favelas
Neighbourhoods in Rio de Janeiro (city)